Kumphawapi railway station is a railway station located in Phan Don Subdistrict, Kumphawapi District, Udon Thani Province.

References 

Railway stations in Thailand
Udon Thani province